Asemeia is a genus of flowering plants belonging to the family Polygalaceae.

Species
, Plants of the World Online accepted the following species:

Asemeia acuminata (Willd.) J.F.B.Pastore & J.R.Abbott
Asemeia apopetala (Brandegee) J.F.B.Pastore & J.R.Abbott
Asemeia echinosperma (Görts) J.F.B.Pastore & J.R.Abbott
Asemeia extraaxillaris (Chodat) J.F.B.Pastore & J.R.Abbott
Asemeia floribunda (Benth.) J.F.B.Pastore & J.R.Abbott
Asemeia galmeri (Chodat) J.F.B.Pastore & J.R.Abbott
Asemeia glabra (A.W.Benn.) J.F.B.Pastore & J.R.Abbott
Asemeia grandiflora (Walter) Small
Asemeia hebeclada (DC.) J.F.B.Pastore & J.R.Abbott
Asemeia hirsuta (A.St.-Hil. & Moq.) J.F.B.Pastore & J.R.Abbott
Asemeia hondurana (Chodat) J.F.B.Pastore & J.R.Abbott
Asemeia ignatii (Chodat) J.F.B.Pastore & J.R.Abbott
Asemeia ilheotica (Wawra) J.F.B.Pastore & J.R.Abbott
Asemeia lindmaniana (Chodat) J.F.B.Pastore & J.R.Abbott
Asemeia marquesiana (J.F.B.Pastore & T.B.Cavalc.) J.F.B.Pastore & J.R.Abbott
Asemeia martiana (A.W.Benn.) J.F.B.Pastore & J.R.Abbott
Asemeia mollis (Kunth) J.F.B.Pastore & J.R.Abbott
Asemeia monninoides (Kunth) J.F.B.Pastore & J.R.Abbott
Asemeia monticola (Kunth) J.F.B.Pastore & J.R.Abbott
Asemeia ovata (Poir.) J.F.B.Pastore & J.R.Abbott
Asemeia parietaria (Chodat) J.F.B.Pastore & J.R.Abbott
Asemeia pohliana (A.St.-Hil. & Moq.) J.F.B.Pastore & J.R.Abbott
Asemeia pseudohebeclada (Chodat) J.F.B.Pastore & J.R.Abbott
Asemeia rhodoptera (Mart. ex A.W.Benn.) J.F.B.Pastore & J.R.Abbott
Asemeia securidaca (Chodat) J.F.B.Pastore & J.R.Abbott
Asemeia sphaerospora (Chodat) J.F.B.Pastore & J.R.Abbott
Asemeia tobatiensis (Chodat) J.F.B.Pastore & J.R.Abbott
Asemeia tonsa (S.F.Blake) J.F.B.Pastore & J.R.Abbott
Asemeia violacea (Aubl.) J.F.B.Pastore & J.R.Abbott

References

Polygalaceae
Fabales genera